Kucherenko, a surname of Ukrainian origin. It is derived from the Ukrainian word kucher, "coachman", and the suffix -enko, denoting descent.

The surname may refer to:

 Ivan Kucherenko (footballer) (born 1987), Ukrainian football player 
 Oleksandr Kucherenko (born 1991), Ukrainian and Moldovan football player 
 Oleksiy Kucherenko (born 1961), Ukrainian politician 
 Olga Kucherenko (born 1985), Russian long jumper
 Serhiy Kucherenko (born 1984), Ukrainian football player 
 Yevhen Kucherenko (born 1999), Ukrainian football player 
 Yevheniia Kucherenko (1922–2020), Ukrainian pedagogue

Also may refer to:

 Ivan Kuchuhura-Kucherenko (1878–1937), Ukrainian minstrel (kobzar)
 Oleg Kutscherenko (born 1968), Ukrainian-born German wrestler

See also
 
 Kucher (surname)

Ukrainian-language surnames
Occupational surnames
Surnames of Ukrainian origin